Old Harbour Road Cricket Ground is a cricket ground in Port Esquivel, Jamaica.

History
With the introduction of the bauxite mining industry to Jamaica in the late 1950s and mid 1960s, a number of sports and social club's were constructed for their employees. The Port Esquivel Sports Club was one such sports and social club, formed for the workers of the nearby Windalco mining operations. The ground played host to two List A one-day matches in the Red Stripe Bowl. The first match was between the University of the West Indies and Saint Vincent and the Grenadines in the 2002–03 edition, with the second match being between Jamaica and Canada in the 2003–04 edition.

Records

List A
Highest team total: 269 for 7 (50 overs) by University of the West Indies v Saint Vincent and the Grenadines, 2002–03
Lowest team total: 196 all out (50 overs) by Canada v Jamaica, 2003–04
Highest individual innings: 72 by Jason Haynes for University of the West Indies v Saint Vincent and the Grenadines, 2002–03
Best bowling in an innings: 4-52 by Kenroy Martin for Saint Vincent and the Grenadines v University of the West Indies, as above

See also
List of cricket grounds in the West Indies

References

External links
Old Harbour Road Cricket Ground at ESPNcricinfo

Cricket grounds in Jamaica